The Treehouse Hotel London is a hotel in Central London, England. It is located on the corner of Langham Place and Riding House Street, formerly the site of the Queen's Hall concert hall, which was bombed in 1941. The hotel was developed by the Crown Estate as the Saint Georges Hotel  and operated under that name until 2019, when the structure was gutted and renovated and the hotel was renamed Treehouse Hotel London.

The 95 guest rooms of the hotel occupy floors 9 to 14 of a mixed-use building.

References

External links
Official site

Hotels in London
Hotels established in 1963
Hotels established in 2019
Hotel buildings completed in 1963